Trip The Light Fantastic is the solo debut album from Ladybug Mecca, a member from hip-hop group Digable Planets. The album was released June 2005 on the indie label Nu Paradigm and features production by jazz musician Brian Jackson, who had also toured with Digable Planets. The album consists of a variety of genres, including samba, hip-hop, jazz, and rock. Ladybug Mecca raps and sings on the album.

Track listing
 Dark Matter 
 Don't Disturb the Peace 
 Children Say 
 Ladybug Come Outside 
 Show the World 
 Mr. Mayor 
 Dogg Starr 
 Leaving It All Behind 
 Sexual Alchemy 
 Centre of Nowhere 
 Please Don't 
 Last Train (featuring Martin Luther)
 Sweet & Polite 
 Suicidethol (Killufast Capsules) 100/mg
 You Never Get Over It 
 Remember When? 
 Oh Poor You 
 Step Up Wise
 If I Need to Move On (Sometimes) [bonus track]

References

2005 albums
Ladybug Mecca albums